Allen Behlok (born 16 October 1998) is a Lebanese alpine skier. He competed in the 2018 Winter Olympics.

References

1998 births
Living people
Alpine skiers at the 2018 Winter Olympics
Lebanese male alpine skiers
Olympic alpine skiers of Lebanon